Abraham Samuel, also known as "Tolinar Rex," born in Martinique (or possibly in Anosy, Madagascar), was a mulatto pirate of the Indian Ocean in the days of the Pirate Round in the late-1690s. Being shipwrecked on his way back to New York, he briefly led a combined pirate-Antanosy kingdom from Fort Dauphin (see Tolanaro), Madagascar, from 1697 until he died there in 1705.

Life
Samuel had been born and raised in Martinique. In 1696 he arrived in the Arabian Sea, serving as quartermaster aboard the pirate ship John and Rebecca. Decimated by illness, they sailed down the eastern coast of Madagascar, seeking slaves to bring back to the New World with them. In October, 1697, while at anchor in the Fort Dauphin harbor, a storm came up which resulted in their anchor ropes being severed and their ship beached. They took refuge in the abandoned fort while they waited for another ship to come rescue them. However, the elderly princess of the Antanosy king felt Samuel was her son, who her French husband had taken with him when he left Fort Dauphin in 1674. And before long, with 20 heavily armed fellow pirates who served as his bodyguard along with 300 Antanosy soldiers, Samuel was proclaimed king of the region surrounding Fort Dauphin, taking the title of "King of Port Dolfphin, Tollannare, Farrawe, Fanquestt, Fownzahira in Madagascar" (p. 413). This was most likely the old heartland of the ZafiRaminia kingdom. He had 15 large outrigger canoes and was constantly at war with the Antanosy king Diamarang Diamera.

One of the incidents during Samuel's brief rule of the Fort Dauphin area was the following. In 1698, early in the career of John Cruger (the elder, the Mayor of New York from 1739 till his death in 1744), while he was "a mere youth" he was appointed as Supercargo under Captain (see Captain (nautical)) Appel of the Prophet Daniel, to buy slaves for what was by then a regular "slaver" (slave ship) out of New York. It was bound for Madagascar on what would be its last voyage. Of that fateful trip, during which Cruger met and very unsuccessfully sought to do business with Abraham Samuel in Fort Dauphin, he wrote:

New York, Friday, 15th July, 1698, we weighed anchor bound for the island of Don Mascowrena; 3d October, found ourselves under the ... St. Thomas Island, went in to water and clean the ship ; ... 7th October, sailed from St. Thomas; 20th February, 1699, Captain and Master judged themselves to leeward of the island Don Mascowrena; Sunday, 13th July, we arrived at Mattatana, (whither we had been compelled to turn our course,) and I went on shore to trade for negroes, but the harbor proving bad we were forced to remove from that place – I having purchased 50 slaves at St. Mattatana; 24th August, arrived at Fort Dolphin; 27th do.

I acquainted Mr. Abraham Samuel, the king of that place, of my arrival, and came with him to a trade; 12th September, I went with Mr. Samuel twenty-five miles up in the country, and on the 14th in the morning, I got the miserable news that our ship was taken by a vessel that came into the harbour the night before. Whereupon I made all the haste down I could, when we got some of the subjects of Mr. Samuel to assist, us, and we fired upon said pirate for two days, but could do no good. Then I hired two men to swim off in the night to cut their cables, but Mr. Samuel charged them not to meddle with them, (as I was informed, said Samuel having got a letter from on board the said pirates, in which I suppose they made great promises, so that he forbid us upon our lives not to meddle with any of said pirates).

When said ship came in at an anchor they desired our boat to give them a cast on shore, they having lost their boats, and pretended to be a merchant ship, and had about 50 negroes on board. At night, said Captain of said ship desired that our boat might give him a cast on board of his ship, which was done, and coming on board he desired the men to drink with him, and when said men were going on board of our ship again they stopped them by violence, and at about 9 at night, they manned the boat and took our ship, and presently carried away all the money that was on board, rigging, and other things that they had occasion for, and then gave the ship and negroes, and other things that were on board to said Mr. Samuel. The Captain's name of the pirate was Evan Jones... [and crew] from Westchester, New York, and others.

Mr. Abraham Samuel took likewise away from me 22 casks of powder and 49 small arms, likewise all the sails belonging to the Prophet which were on shore, and then sold the ship again to Isaac Ruff, Thomas Welles, Edmd. Conklin and Edward Woodman, as it was reported, for 1,400 pieces of eight. The purchasers designed to go from Fort Dolphin to the island of Don Mascowrena, and thence to Mattatana, upon Madagascar, and so for America. Captain Henry Appel ... [and two others] went along with them;

[S]ome days after there arrived at Fort Dolphin a small pinke, called the Vine, Thomas Warrent, master, from London, which took in slaves from said place, and bound for Barbadoes, in which I took my passage, and was forced to pay for the same 66 pieces of eight and two slaves.

" Saturday, 18th November, 1699, I departed from Fort Dolphin with four of the people more that belonged to the ship Prophet Daniel, in the aforesaid pinke Vine, for Barbadoes, leaving on shore, of the ship's company, only a mulatto boy, called Gabriel; ... 24th March,arrived at Barbadoes; 17th April, 1700 departed from Barbadoes in the pinke Blossom, Robert Darkins, commander, bound for New York ; 11th May, 1700,1 arrived at New York, and because I may not be censured an ill man, and that it may be thought that I have saved any thing that belongs to the owners of said ship, I do declare that I have not, directly nor indirectly, saved any thing that belongs to them, nor wronged them of the value of a farthing, but contrary, I have done all possible to serve their interest that I could.
"JOHN CRUGER."

According to Butel et al. (2000), at this point in time New York shipped provisions including gunpowder and guns to Madagascar, which were then traded for slaves, who were primarily prisoners of war, which were then shipped back to New York (one of the reasons for gathering slaves in Madagascar was because at one point it cost only 10 shillings worth of goods to buy one there while it was costing three to four pounds sterling to purchase one in West Africa). These authors also note that Cruger had so antagonized the crew on the front end of the journey, including one New Yorker of African origins, that by the time they reached Sao Tome, the Captain indicated they would mutiny if not paid at least some of their wages. As noted above, Cruger sold some of the ship's rigging to pay for this.

For more information on Abraham Samuel, see

Timeline 
1642–73 – First French colonial settlement (or Factory (trading post)) in Anosy briefly established by the French East India Company at Manafiafy, 40 km. northeast of Tolagnaro, but then moved to what became Fort Dauphin in 1643. Several different Governors of Fort Dauphin sought to conquer Anosy, pillaging and then burning hundreds of Antanosy and Mahafaly villages, killing thousands of Malagasy, enslaving others and stealing tens of thousands of cattle. During this time the French living there also fought for several of the Antanosy kings.
1674 – Fort Dauphin evacuated and fort and settlement closed after over half of the French residents were killed. A young boy, the son of a Frenchman and an Antanosy wife, is taken from Fort Dauphin when the site is abandoned by the French [While Butel et al. (2000) argue this person then sold the boy as a slave on Martinque, this is hard to believe if he was actually his son.]
1694 – Captain John Hoar, of Rhode Island, with a privateer license issued by the English authority in Jamaica, captures a 200-ton, 14 gun French ship which he brings back to Rhode Island. Abraham Samuel, the mulatto son of a French planter and a slave, having fled Martinique, joined the crew at some point. The Admiralty Court awards the ship to Captain Hoar who renames it the John and Rebecca. Having received a privateering commission from the Governor of New York, he fitted her out as a privateer.
1695 – Captain Hoar sails from Boston for the Indian Ocean in December with 114 crew on board, two of whom were the brothers Otto and Aert van Tuyl, both ship carpenters by trade, which is what Aert was for the ship, while Otto was the ship's doctor (for more information on their trip, see Van Tuyl). At some point on this journey Abraham Samuel was elected quartermaster by the crew.
1696 – April stopover at St. Mary's island (Île Sainte-Marie), Madagascar, a major pirate center at that time, from which additional crew members could always be recruited. Captain Hoar then sailed with the Dutch pirate Dirk Chivers and in the Red Sea they seized several Indian and European ships, one of which was the Rouparelle. Captain Hoar then sailed on alone to the Persian Gulf where he captured a large Indian ship laden with cloth near Surat.
1697 – Captain Hoar returned to Saint Mary's Island, anchoring at Port Mission in February. While there, however, the Malagasy living there rebelled against Adam Baldridge, the retired pirate who was the middleman between the pirates who stopped there and the New York merchants who shipped them gunpowder, guns and other supplies, and in turn bought the booty and slaves they sold. A number of Samuel's fellow pirates, including Captain Hoar, died in this revolt, but now Captain Samuel and other of his pirate colleagues escaped on the John and Rebecca, which by then was in a sorry state.
1697 – Captain Samuel and his fellow survivors sail down the east coast of Madagascar on their way home to New York. However, their ship is wrecked (washed ashore when a storm cut the cables or sank after hitting a reef somewhere near what had been the French settlement at Fort Dauphin), so he and those with him occupy the abandoned fort. Not long after this the wife of a deceased Antanosy king who was ruling the area saw the shipwrecked men bathing in the ocean and markings on Captain Samuel's body which she felt were identical to those of her own son, who had been taken away in 1674 by his French dad when the fort was abandoned. She declared Samuel her long-lost son and declared him heir to the Antanosy kingdom in that area. While not true, Samuel accepts this claim and together with at least 45 other shipwrecked pirates, 20 who served as his bodyguards, and with the help of some Antanosy, Samuel subdued the local Antanosy ruler and begins to conduct piracy of ships stopping in the harbor. He also engages in warfare with a neighboring Antanosy kingdom after claiming rule over the old heartland of the Zafiraminy which appeared to have been abandoned. The settlement of Fort Dauphin rivals St. Mary as a trading center for at least a short period of time. While Samuel traded slaves and stolen goods with slavers and pirates alike, he kept close connections with his pirate brethren, authorizing and helping them in the plunder of ships which came to the Anosy region.
1699 – 25 additional pirates who were on their way back to America find Fort Dauphin to be such that they choose to join King Samuel.
 – In August John Cruger (senior), who later became Mayor of New York city in the mid-18th century, was seeking slaves for the Prophet Daniel's trip back to New York from Madagascar stopped in Fort Dauphin. He accompanied King Samuel on a journey 25 miles inland from Fort Dauphin to Samuel's country residence where he stayed for two days, all in order to obtain 100 slaves. While he was away, Pirate Evan Jones, Captain of the Beckford Galley dropped anchor in Fort Dauphin alongside Cruger's slaver, the Prophet Daniel. Jones had the crew of the slaver take him ashore where he got them drunk, then continuing the party aboard his own ship. However at 9 pm that evening he and his crew assaulted the crew of the slaver and then captured and looted their ship, taking its money, rigging and anything else the pirates wanted. John Cruger, having rushed back to Fort Dauphin after hearing his ship had been captured by pirates, first had several of King Samuel's soldiers shoot at both ships with their muskets. With no results after two days of this, he then asked for two soldiers to swim out and cut the anchor cables of both ships so they would drift ashore. However Samuel at this point ordered his 300 warriors and 15 war canoes to not meddle in this disagreement between these two New Yorkers, in part because he had been promised a "pourboire" (reward) for his protection of them. This was the ship the Prophet Daniel along with 55 slaves and 49 small arms. Samuel in turn sold this ship to Edward Woodman and three other pirates for 1,400 pieces of eight, signing the document which detailed their purchase as "King of Fort Dauphin, Tollannare, Farrawe, Fanquest, and Fownzahíra." When John Cruger protested this, Samuel confiscated the property he had brought to shore which included 22 casks of gunpowder and a set of sails. At this point the captain of the Prophet Daniel and two of his crewman also decided to become pirates (Zacks, 2002). This was one of 3 ships taken by surprise when they stopped in port during this time, all of which were looted "down to the keel" (p. 413). Not surprisingly, very few ships stopped at Fort Dauphin for several years after this happened. These captured ships brought in silver and other goods from overseas, including iron cooking pots which appear to have replaced the traditional ceramic pots which the Antanosy had made up to this time.
 – In November Samuel assessed an American slaver which passed through Fort Dauphin £100 for a trading license.
1700 – Captain Littleton, of the English Royal Navy, invited King Samuel and two of his wives to dine with him aboard his ship. Littleton reported Samuel was much loved by the Malagasy.
1701 – Robert Drury (sailor) indicated the Captain of the sinking ship he was on chose not to anchor at "Port Dauphine" as one of his sailors who "knew the land" said  "the king of that part of the island ["King Samuel"] was at enmity with all white men, and treated all the Europeans he met with very barbarously" (Defoe et al., 1891, p. 44). (Drury later indicated it was only French the Malagasy considered enemies,as they had done some kind of "injury" to him.) (p. 45)
– Drury indicated "Deaan Tuley-Noro, king of Antenosa" [Antanosy], had marched into "Anterndroea" (Androy), demanding satisfaction from the Antandroy king for the murder of several white men. Drury also indicated quite a few sailors he knew at that time had been freely living in "Port Dauphine" for 2.5 years, waiting for a ship to stop by which they could leave on (p. 94).
1705 – In latter part of this year, in spite of being in poor health, King Samuel led his troops into battle against a neighboring petty kingdom. He died two months later and his kingdom ends with his death. The remaining pirates vanish soon thereafter, their fate unknown.
1706 – A Dutch slave ship anchored in Fort Dauphin in December to find Abraham Samuel no longer there and the new Antanosy king of the area unwilling to discuss what had happened to him.

See also
Adam Baldridge and James Plaintain, two other ex-pirates who established trading posts on or near Madagascar.
John Leadstone, an ex-pirate nicknamed "Old Captain Crackers" who established a trading post on the west coast of Africa

References

External links 
Buccaneer Software. (2009?). "Pirate Roster" at Pirate's hold: Pirate history and beyond
 cleanmix.com (n.d.). The legend of pirates.
[Kinkor, Kenneth J. (1995). From the seas! Black men under the black flag. American Visions, 10.]
Onica, V'le. (2008). "Captain John Hoar" at Pirate Cove.
Rogozinski, Jan. (2000). Honor among thieves: Captain Kidd, Henry Every, and the Pirate Democracy in the Indian Ocean.
Vallar, Cindy. (2007). "Black Pirates" at Pirates & Privateers: The history of maritime piracy

17th-century pirates
18th-century pirates
1705 deaths
Year of birth missing
Shipwreck survivors
African monarchs